Banana Kong is an endless running video game developed by FDG Entertainment for Android and iOS. It was released on January 24, 2012. The player controls a gorilla who runs from an endless wave of banana peels.

Gameplay 

Players control the game by tapping the screen to jump. Collecting bananas charge the power bar, simultaneously, players sprint away from a massive wave of banana peels. When the power bar is full, the character can thrust forward by swiping right, this gameplay mechanic allows you to get further away from the tsunami and break certain obstacles. The main gameplay area is a jungle, but other areas can be accessed through various means, including a cavern, ocean, beach, and treetop. Each area has a specific pet which aids the player. There is the toucan, the boar, the turtle, the snake, and the giraffe. The objective of the game is to progress further by avoiding all of the obstacles. There are also objectives which can be completed during one or several runs. The gorillas will meet new difficulties and ride along with animal companions as the gorillas' team transport gorillas to safety.

As the game gets faster, the player will have to react to incoming impediments much more quickly, all while collecting more bananas. At the end of the run, the player can use their bananas to purchase upgrades, allowing for longer runs, and fueling another wave of peels in the process.

Reception 
The application has been downloaded by 100+ million users and has an average Google Play Store rating of 4.4 stars out of 5.

Banana Kong has received generally positive reviews from critics. Nadia Oxford from Gamezebo praised the game, saying; "unbelievably addictive, immediately accessible, and enjoyable every time you pick it up." IGN’s Justin Davis was more critical, noting its "cute" presentation and "easy-to-master controls", but finding it "nothing special" in comparison to other endless running games.

It holds a rating of 4.6 stars based on 4,864,032 votes on similarweb.

Sequels 
A sequel, Banana Kong 2, was released to Android and iOS devices on July 12, 2022. It features more maps, animal characters, new events and better graphics.

See also 

 Impact of the COVID-19 pandemic on the video game industry

References

External links 

 Official website
 YouTube Official

2013 video games
Mobile games
Platform games